Rum Cay (formerly known as Mamana and Santa Maria de la Concepción) is an island and district of the Bahamas. It measures  in area, it is located at Lat.: N23 42' 30" - Long.: W 74 50' 00". It has many rolling hills that rise to about 120 feet (37 m).

The island is believed to have acquired its modern name from a shipwrecked cargo of rum. The main settlement is Port Nelson. Its population was recorded as 99  and as 30 . Before 1996 the island was part of a combined district of San Salvador and Rum Cay. The population of Rum Cay as of 2015 is 53.

Location

Rum Cay is 20 miles (32 km) southwest of San Salvador Island.

History

Aboriginals

Rum Cay was called Mamana (or Manigua), meaning "mid waters land", by the native Lucayans. In the north there is a cave containing Lucayan drawings and carvings. Various artifacts from the Arawak period have been found by farmers in the fertile soil, which the natives enriched with bat guano.

Spanish
Some writers, such as Samuel Eliot Morison, identified Rum Cay as the site of one of Christopher Columbus' landfalls during his 1492 voyage, as the island Columbus called Santa María de la Concepción. However, a variety of other historians, geographers, and other writers identify the island as corresponding to different islands in the Bahamas or Caicos.

Loyalists
Plantation boundaries known as ‘margins’ can be seen all over the island, which date from the beginning of the 19th century when Loyalists settled here.

Today
Tourism has traditionally been the main source of employment. Nearly everybody lives in Port Nelson where cottages can be rented.

Places of interest
Deep reefs and drop-offs surround this former pirates’ haven. There is staghorn coral at Summer Point Reef and diving at Pinder’s Point. At the Grand Canyon, 60-foot coral walls almost reach the surface. Sumner Point Marina has dockage, fuel, moorings, WiFi, bar and restaurant. As of summer 2013, this marina is closed, and has only dockage available but absolutely no services.

HMS Conqueror 

The wreck of the 101-gun man of war HMS Conqueror, built in Devon in 1855 and which served in the Crimean War, lies in 30 feet of water off Rum Cay. She was lost on Sumner Point Reef, Rum Cay, on December 13, 1861.  All 1,400 aboard survived. The wreck is preserved as the Underwater Museum of the Bahamas. It is the property of The Bahamas Government and none of the contents of the ship may be removed.

"She was 20 nm out in estimating her position and, after making her landfall, cut rounding the southeast point of Rum Cay too fine and went hard on the reef.  Her captain, fearing that his crew (most of whom could not swim in those days) would drink themselves insensible when it became obvious the ship was lost, ordered all ale, wine, and spirit casks to be broken and their contents ditched.  He then sent the two largest ship’s company unloaded everything they could salvage, and set about making a camp on the island.  The captain remained on board with one midshipman and ten seamen until the ship broke up.  Then all of them, less the boat parties, were marooned on Rum Cay.  They were rescued soon after the news of the disaster was known."

Transportation
The island is served by Port Nelson Airport.

References

External links 

 General information about Rum Cay

Islands of the Bahamas
Districts of the Bahamas